Aubrey Joseph "Ab" Strosnider (May 9, 1904 – October 27, 1964) was an American football player and coach. 

He was born in Newport, Ohio, in 1904. He attended University of Dayton Prep School, then enrolled at the University of Dayton, where he played football from 1923 to 1927. He also played one game in the National Football League for the Dayton Triangles in 1928. He later became a football coach at Catholic High School in Dayton, and later still an assistant coach for the University of Dayton.

Strosnider died in 1964 in Cleveland. He was posthumously inducted into the University of Dayton Hall of Fame in 1982.

References

Players of American football from Ohio
Dayton Triangles players
Dayton Flyers football players
1904 births
1964 deaths